Beaconsfield is a small inner southern suburb of Sydney, Australia. Beaconsfield is located 5 kilometres south of the Sydney central business district and is part of the local government area of the City of Sydney.  The postcode is 2015.

Beaconsfield has a mixture of industrial and medium to high density residential areas.

Beaconsfield is part of the Green Square district which is currently undergoing gentrification. This involves an urban renewal project that is constructing modern retail, business and residential developments.

History
The suburb was named after Benjamin Disraeli, Lord Beaconsfield, a British prime minister during the reign of Queen Victoria. The area was part of the suburb of Alexandria and was officially gazetted on 10 June 1977.

Demographics
At the 2021 census, 1,172 people were living in Beaconsfield.

The most common other countries of birth were Indonesia (5.2%), England (3.9%), New Zealand (3.0%), China (excludes SARs and Taiwan; 2.7%) and Vietnam (2.0%). 68.3% of residents spoke only English at home. Other languages spoken at home included Indonesian (4.6%), Cantonese (3.8%), Mandarin (3.5%), Spanish (2.0%) and Vietnamese (1.3%). The most common responses for religious affiliation were no religion (39.0%), Catholic (24.3%), Anglican (7.2%) and Buddhist (4.4%).

Transport
Green Square railway station is located in the northern part of the suburb and is part of a large urban renewal project.

References

Suburbs of Sydney